Guy Auffray (8 February 1945 – 11 January 2021) was a French judoka. He was active from 1967 to 1976 and was a Red Belt 9th degree.

Awards
 Gold Medal for  the 80 kg class at the 1971 European Judo Championships
 Bronze Medal for the 80 kg class at the 1971 World Judo Championships
 Silver Medal for the 80 kg class at the 1973 European Judo Championships

References

External links
 

1945 births
2021 deaths
French judoka